2G is a short notation for second-generation cellular network, a group of technology standards employed for cellular networks. 2G was commercially launched on the GSM standard in Finland by Radiolinja (now part of Elisa Oyj) in 1991. After 2G was launched, the previous mobile wireless network systems were retroactively dubbed 1G. While radio signals on 1G networks are analog, radio signals on 2G networks are digital, though both systems use digital signaling to connect cellular radio towers to the rest of the mobile network system.

The most common 2G technology was the time-division multiple access (TDMA)-based GSM standard, used in most of the world outside Japan. In North America, Digital AMPS (IS-54 and IS-136) and cdmaOne (IS-95) were dominant, but GSM was also used. In Japan the ubiquitous system was Personal Digital Cellular (PDC) though another, Personal Handy-phone System (PHS), also existed.

Three primary benefits of 2G networks over their 1G predecessors were:
 Digitally encrypted phone conversations, at least between the mobile phone and the cellular base station but not necessarily in the rest of the network.
 Significantly more efficient use of the radio frequency spectrum enabling more users per frequency band. 
 Data services for mobile, starting with SMS text messages then expanding to Multimedia Messaging Service (MMS).

With General Packet Radio Service (GPRS), 2G offers a theoretical maximum transfer speed of 40 kbit/s (5 kB/s). With EDGE (Enhanced Data Rates for GSM Evolution), there is a theoretical maximum transfer speed of 384 kbit/s (48 kB/s).

Evolution

2.5G (GPRS) 

2.5G ("second and a half generation") is used to describe 2G-systems that have implemented a packet-switched domain in addition to the circuit-switched domain. It doesn't necessarily provide faster service because bundling of timeslots is used for circuit-switched data services (HSCSD) as well.

2.75G (EDGE) 

GPRS networks evolved to EDGE networks with the introduction of 8PSK encoding. While the symbol rate remained the same at 270.833 samples per second, each symbol carried three bits instead of one. Enhanced Data rates for GSM Evolution (EDGE), Enhanced GPRS (EGPRS), or IMT Single Carrier (IMT-SC) is a backward-compatible digital mobile phone technology that allows improved data transmission rates, as an extension on top of standard GSM. EDGE was deployed on GSM networks beginning in 2003, initially by AT&T in the United States.

Phase-out 

2G, understood as GSM and CDMA, has been superseded by newer technologies such as 3G (UMTS / CDMA2000), 4G (LTE / WiMAX) and 5G (5G NR); however, 2G networks were still available  in most parts of Europe, Africa, Central America and South America, and many modern LTE-enabled devices have the ability to fall back to 2G for phone calls, necessary especially in rural areas where later generations have not yet been implemented. In some places, its successor 3G is being shut down rather than 2G – Vodafone previously announced that it had switched off 3G across Europe in 2020 but still retains 2G as a fallback service. In the US T-Mobile shut down their 3G services while retaining their 2G GSM network.

Various carriers have made announcements that 2G technology in the United States, Japan, Australia, and other countries are in the process of being shut down, or have already shut down 2G services so that carriers can re-use the frequencies for newer technologies (e.g. 4G, 5G).

In 2022, Android 12 introduced a system setting to disable 2G connectivity for the device, as 2G is considered to be insecure.

Criticism 
In some parts of the world, including the United Kingdom, 2G remains widely used for older feature phones and for internet of things (IoT) devices such as smart meters, eCall systems and vehicle trackers to avoid the high patent licensing cost of newer technologies. Terminating 2G services could leave vulnerable people who rely on 2G infrastructure unable to communicate even with emergency contacts, causing harm and possibly deaths.

Past 2G networks

See also
 Cliff effect
 Dropout
 List of mobile phone generations
 Mobile radio telephone, also known as 0G
 Wireless device radiation and health
 3G
 4G
 5G

References

Mobile telecommunications
Software-defined radio
Wireless communication systems